Talkh Ab-e Valad (also Romanized as Talkh Āb-e Valad; also known as Talkh Āb) is a village in Mishan Rural District, Mahvarmilani District, Mamasani County, Fars Province, Iran. At the 2006 census, its population was 40, in 9 families.

References 

Populated places in Mamasani County